Zithobeni (a Zulu word meaning humble yourselves) is a township situated in Gauteng, South Africa, just north of Bronkhorstspruit and southwest of Ekangala.

References

Populated places in the City of Tshwane
Townships in Gauteng